Most of the colleges and institutions of higher education in Ranchi, Jharkhand, India are under the jurisdiction of Ranchi University.

As the institutions of higher studies fall short of city's requirement, many students, after completing schooling in the state, move away to places like New Delhi, Karnataka and several other locations for study of higher technical and non-technical subjects.

Autonomous

Indian Institute of Information Technology 
Indian Institute of Management Ranchi 
National Institute of Foundry and Forge Technology
National University of Study and Research in Law
 Xavier Institute of Social Service

Engineering
 Jharkhand Rai University
 Birla Institute of Technology, Mesra
 Birla Institute of Technology, Extension centre, Lalpur 	
 Cambridge Institute of Technology, Tatisilwai

General Colleges
 Yogoda Satsanga Mahavidyalaya
 Doranda College Doranda 	 
 Gossner College 	 
 Gossner Theological College 	 
 J. N. College
 Mahendra Prasad Mahavidyalaya 
 Marwari Boys' College 	 
 Marwari Girl's College
 Moulana Azad College 
 Nirmala College, Doranda, Ranchi 
 Ranchi College 
 Ranchi Women's College
 St. Paul's College, Ranchi 	 
 St. Xavier's College, Ranchi
 Sanjay Gandhi Memorial College	 
 Suraj Singh Memorial College
 Silli College Silli , Ranchi

Law
 Chotanagpur Law College

Medical
Rajendra Institute of Medical Sciences
Sadar Medical College and Hospital, Ranchi
Central Institute of Psychiatry

University
 Jharkhand Rai University
 [[Birsa Agricultural
 Sarala Birla University 
University]]
 Central University of Jharkhand 
 ICFAI University, Jharkhand
 Amity University, Jharkhand
 Jharkhand Raksha Shakti University
 Ranchi University
 Sai Nath University

Other
 Central Institute of Mining and Fuel Research
 Central Institute of Psychiatry
 Indian Institute of Agricultural Biotechnology
 Indian Institute of Coal Management 
 Indian Institute of Legal Metrology 
 Indian Institute of Natural Resins and Gums
 International Institute of Professional Studies
 Institute of Management Studies, Ranchi
 Institute of Science & Management
 Kejriwal Institute of Management
 Ranchi Institute of Neuropsychiatry and Applied Sciences
 NILAI Group of Institutions Ranchi
 Ram Tahal Choudhary Institute of Technology
 SBS College, Ranchi
 Swami Mangal Das Pranami College
 Usha Martin University
 Ranchi Veterinary College, Kanke, Ranchi
 Ranchi Agriculture College, Kanke, Ranchi

References 

 
 

 
Ranchi
Jharkhand-related lists